Tylersburg is a census-designated place located in Farmington Township, Clarion County, Pennsylvania, United States. As of the 2010 census the population was 196.

References

External links

Census-designated places in Clarion County, Pennsylvania